Claus Peter (born 27 March 1940) is a German athlete. He competed in the men's hammer throw at the 1960 Summer Olympics.

References

1940 births
Living people
Sportspeople from Cottbus
People from the Province of Brandenburg
German male hammer throwers
Olympic athletes of the United Team of Germany
Athletes (track and field) at the 1960 Summer Olympics
East German Athletics Championships winners